Gyralina hausdorfi is an extinct species of air-breathing land snail, a terrestrial pulmonate gastropod mollusk in the family Pristilomatidae.

Gyralina hausdorfi is considered to be extinct.

Distribution 
This species was endemic to Greece.

References

Pristilomatidae
Extinct gastropods
Endemic fauna of Greece
Gastropods described in 1990